Jonathan Gómez may refer to:

 Jonathan Gómez (Paraguayan footballer) (born 1985), Paraguayan football midfielder
 Jonathan David Gómez (born 1989), Argentine footballer
 Jonathan Gómez (swimmer) (born 1996), Colombian swimmer
 Jonathan Gómez (footballer, born 2003), Mexican-American football left-back